Veobreahesten or Veobrehesten is the 61st highest mountain in Norway. It is in Lom Municipality in Innlandet county. The mountain is surrounded by several other notable mountains including Spiterhøi and Skauthøi to the northwest; Steinbukampen and Veopallan to the northeast; Veotinden, Veobretinden, Austre Memurutinden to the southeast; Store Memurutinden to the south; and Leirhøi to the southwest.

The mountain is a nunatak standing in the middle of the glacier under the neighboring mountain Leirhøi. Its late ascent is due to this remote location, and the rather challenging approach.

Name
The first element is the name of the glacier Veobreen. The last element is the finite form of hest which means 'horse' (several mountains in Norway are named after animals). The name of the glacier is a compound of the river name Veo and the finite form of bre which means 'glacier'. The river name is derived from the word viðr which means 'wood' or 'forest'.

See also
List of mountains of Norway by height

References

Jotunheimen
Lom, Norway
Mountains of Innlandet